Telesto  is a moon of Saturn. It was discovered by Smith, Reitsema, Larson and Fountain in 1980 from ground-based observations, and was provisionally designated .

In 1983 it was officially named after Telesto of Greek mythology.

Telesto is co-orbital with Tethys, residing in Tethys' leading Lagrangian point. This relationship was first identified by Seidelmann et al. in 1981. Another moon, Calypso, resides in the other (trailing) Lagrangian point of Tethys, 60 degrees in the other direction from Tethys. The Saturnian system has two additional trojan moons.

Exploration 

The Cassini probe performed a distant flyby of Telesto on October 11, 2005. The resulting images show that its surface is surprisingly smooth, devoid of small impact craters.


Citations

References

External links 

  NASA - Telesto Profile
NASA's Solar System Exploration
 The Planetary Society: Telesto

Moons of Saturn
Trojan moons
19800408
Moons with a prograde orbit